The World According to Star Wars is a book written by Cass Sunstein about the Star Wars franchise. The book analyzes the themes in Star Wars. It uses the series to discuss behavioral psychology.

References 

2016 books
Books about film